Summarecon Bekasi is a township at Bekasi, Indonesia. The area is located within Greater Jakarta metropolitan area. The development has a land area of about 240 hectares. The township is divided into commercial and a residential zone.

Facilities
 Summarecon Mall
 Al-Azhar Islamic School 
 BINUS University.
 HARRIS Hotel & Conventions Bekasi
 Sekolah BPK Penabur Summarecon Bekasi
 Pasar Modern Sinpasa
 Amongan

Summarecon Mall
The mall opened on 28 June 2013 and has a retail area of over 60,000 m2 .  The shopping center is complemented by facilities such as The Downtown Walk, Food Temptation, Bekasi Food City and Atrium which can be used for event and exhibition events.

Transportation 
The township has direct access to Jakarta-Cikampek Toll Road at  West Bekasi Toll Gate (km 12).  TransJakarta operates feeder route from the township to Jakarta city center. Shuttle buses are available within the township. There is a 1 kilometer long flyover, which connects the township main avenues of Bekasi.

See also
 Bekasi
 Jabodetabek

References 

Bekasi
West Java
Post-independence architecture of Indonesia
Planned townships in Indonesia
Planned communities